Team Northumbria Football Club is a football club based in Newcastle upon Tyne. They are the football team of Northumbria University and currently play in the BUCS Premier North League.

History
The club was founded in 1999 as Northumbria University Football Club and joined Division Two of the Northern Alliance. In 2001–02 they were Division Two runners-up, earning promotion to Division One. The club went on to finish as runners-up in Division One the following season, and were promoted to the Premier Division. In 2003 they were renamed Team Northumbria. The club's first season in the Premier Division saw them finish as runners-up. Following a third-place finish in 2004–05, they were Premier Division champions in 2005–06, resulting in promotion to Division Two of the Northern League. The club entered the FA Vase for the first time the following season.

In 2011–12 Team Northumbria won the Northern League's Ernest Armstrong Memorial Cup, beating Chester-le-Street Town on penalties in the final; they also reached the final of the Northumberland Senior Cup, losing on penalties to Newcastle United reserves, as well as winning the Division Two title, resulting in promotion to Division One. Although they were relegated back to Division Two at the end of the 2013–14 season, they were Division Two runners-up in 2016–17 and were promoted to Division One again.

In the summer of 2018, Team Northumbia resigned from the Northern League, continuing playing in the BUCS Premier North League.

Honours
Northern League
Division Two champions 2011–12
Ernest Armstrong Memorial Cup winners 2010–11
Northern Alliance 
Premier Division champions 2005–06

Records
Best FA Cup performance: First qualifying round, 2013–14
Best FA Vase performance: Third round, 2015–16

See also
Team Northumbria F.C. players

References

External links

Football clubs in England
Football clubs in Tyne and Wear
University and college football clubs in England
Football
Association football clubs established in 1999
1999 establishments in England
Northern Football Alliance
Northern Football League